The Lapse was an American indie band formed in late 1997. The band was first signed to Gern Blandsten, then Southern Records. A larger deal with Matador Records fell through in 2001. The Lapse was the duo of then boyfriend/girlfriend Chris Leo (ex-Native Nod and brother of Ted Leo) and Toko Yasuda (Enon, ex-Blonde Redhead). They formed The Lapse after the breakup of their previous band, The Van Pelt. The Lapse had Leo on guitar and Yasuda on bass with both handling vocals. The band welcomed a long list of guest musicians over the years, including Don Devore (bass), Justin DuClos (drums), and Gary Keating (bass).

The Lapse formally disbanded in 2001, with Yasuda leaving to join Enon. Chris Leo's current outfit is the Vague Angels, with Chris as primary singer/songwriter on guitar.

Discography 
Betrayal! (Gern Blandsten) (1998)
Heaven Ain't Happenin' (Southern Records) (2000)

External links
Southern Records - The Lapse official website
[ The Lapse Allmusic.com biography]

American art rock groups
Musical groups established in 1997
1997 establishments in the United States
Musical groups disestablished in 2001
2001 disestablishments in the United States